Bulyak (Büläk) is a rural locality (a village) in Saraysinsky Selsoviet, Sterlibashevsky District, Bashkortostan, Russia. The population was 33 as of 2010. There is 1 street.

Geography 
Bulyak is located 38 km southeast of Sterlibashevo (the district's administrative centre) by road. Saraysino is the nearest rural locality.

References 

Rural localities in Sterlibashevsky District